The 1997 SEC Championship Game was won by the Tennessee Volunteers 30-29 over the Auburn Tigers. The game was played in the Georgia Dome in Atlanta, Georgia, on December 6, 1997, and was televised to a national audience on ABC.

See also
 Auburn–Tennessee football rivalry

References

External links
Recap of the game from SECsports.com

SEC Championship Game
SEC Championship Game
Auburn Tigers football games
Tennessee Volunteers football games
December 1997 sports events in the United States
1997 in sports in Georgia (U.S. state)
1997 in Atlanta